Wongsakorn Chaikultewin (born September 16, 1996), is a Thai professional footballer who plays as an attacking midfielder, he has also been used as a winger for Thai League 1 club Muangthong United.

Honours

Club
Muangthong United
Thailand Champions Cup (1): 2017

References

External links

1996 births
Living people
Wongsakorn Chaikultewin
Wongsakorn Chaikultewin
Association football midfielders
Wongsakorn Chaikultewin
Wongsakorn Chaikultewin
Wongsakorn Chaikultewin
Wongsakorn Chaikultewin
Wongsakorn Chaikultewin
Wongsakorn Chaikultewin
Wongsakorn Chaikultewin
Wongsakorn Chaikultewin